Domesday Book is a record of the great survey of England completed in 1086.

Domesday Book may also refer to:
 Domesday Book, the newsletter of the Castle & Crusade Society
 Exeter Domesday Book, land and tax register

See also
 Doomsday (disambiguation)
 Doomsday Book (disambiguation)
 BBC Domesday Project
 Domesday (disambiguation)